The 2018–19 season was Oxford United's third consecutive season in League One and their 125th year in existence. As well as competing in League One, the club participated in the FA Cup, EFL Cup and EFL Trophy.

Transfers

Transfers in

Transfers out

Loans in

Loans out

Competitions

Friendlies
On 10 May 2018, Oxford United announced a pre-season tour of the Republic of Ireland was to take place in July. Opponents Portmarnock, Longford Town and UCD were revealed four days later. Later that day, friendlies with Oxford City and Hampton & Richmond Borough were scheduled. On 16 May, the club announced a friendly with Milton Keynes Dons.

League One

League table

Results summary

Results by matchday

Matches
On 21 June 2018, the League One fixtures for the forthcoming season were announced.

FA Cup

The first round draw was made live on BBC by Dennis Wise and Dion Dublin on 22 October. The draw for the second round was made live on BBC and BT by Mark Schwarzer and Glenn Murray on 12 November. The third round draw was made live on BBC by Ruud Gullit and Paul Ince from Stamford Bridge on 3 December 2018.

EFL Cup

On 15 June 2018, the draw for the first round was made in Vietnam. The second round draw was made from the Stadium of Light on 16 August. The third-round draw was made on 30 August 2018 by David Seaman and Joleon Lescott, handing Oxford a home tie against defending Premiership champions Manchester City.

EFL Trophy

On 13 July 2018, the initial group stage draw bar the U21 invited clubs was announced. The draw for the second round was made live on Talksport by Leon Britton and Steve Claridge on 16 November. On 8 December, the third round draw was drawn by Alan McInally and Matt Le Tissier on Soccer Saturday. The Quarter-final draw was made conducted on Sky Sports by Don Goodman and Thomas Frank on 10 January 2019.

Squad statistics

Appearances and goals

Top scorers

Disciplinary record

References

Oxford United
Oxford United F.C. seasons